Hudsonville is a city in Ottawa County in the U.S. state of Michigan, and is part of the Grand Rapids metropolitan area.  The population was 7,116 at the 2010 census. Hudsonville is nicknamed "Michigan's Salad Bowl."

History
Hudsonville was platted in 1873, soon after the Chicago and West Michigan Railway was extended to that point. The town was named for Homer E. Hudson, a pioneer settler, who was also the town's first postmaster. The early settlement of Hudsonville was next to a swamp, which hampered early development. In 1872, construction of the Chicago and West Michigan Railroad was completed. The railroad brought more settlers to the area, including many Dutch immigrants.

Geography

Points of interest 
Terra Squareis a mixed-use community center, located in downtown Hudsonville at 3380 Chicago Drive. Terra Square offers an event space and a work space, in addition to hosting the Hudsonville Farmers Market.

Demographics

2010 census
As of the census of 2010, there were 7,116 people, 2,582 households, and 1,901 families living in the city. The racial makeup of the city was 94.3% White, 1.5% African American, 0.4% Native American, 0.8% Asian, 1.3% from other races, and 1.7% from two or more races. Hispanic or Latino of any race were 3.2% of the population.

There were 2,582 households, of which 37.1% had children under the age of 18 living with them, 60.4% were married couples living together, 9.8% had a female householder with no husband present, 3.4% had a male householder with no wife present, and 26.4% were non-families. 23.0% of all households were made up of individuals, and 10.2% had someone living alone who was 65 years of age or older. The average household size was 2.71 and the average family size was 3.20.

The median age in the city was 33.5 years. 28.4% of residents were under the age of 18; 8.8% were between the ages of 18 and 24; 25.8% were from 25 to 44; 22.5% were from 45 to 64; and 14.5% were 65 years of age or older. The gender makeup of the city was 47.7% male and 52.3% female.

2000 census
As of the census of 2000, there were 7,160 people, 2,514 households, and 1,920 families living in the city. The racial makeup of the city was 97.71% White, 0.47% African American, 0.27% Native American, 0.41% Asian, 0.01% Pacific Islander, 0.39% from other races, and 0.74% from two or more races. Hispanic or Latino of any race were 1.45% of the population.

There were 2,514 households, out of which 39.5% had children under the age of 18 living with them, 66.4% were married couples living together, 7.5% had a female householder with no husband present, and 23.6% were non-families. 20.4% of all households were made up of individuals, and 9.6% had someone living alone who was 65 years of age or older.  The average household size was 2.80 and the average family size was 3.26.

In the city, the population was spread out, with 30.8% under the age of 18, 9.5% from 18 to 24, 28.2% from 25 to 44, 16.6% from 45 to 64, and 14.9% who were 65 years of age or older.  The median age was 32 years. For every 100 females, there were 91.9 males.  For every 100 females age 18 and over, there were 87.6 males.

The median income for a household in the city was $46,961, and the median income for a family was $55,372. Males had a median income of $41,418 versus $26,554 for females. The per capita income for the city was $19,286.  About 2.4% of families and 4.6% of the population were below the poverty line, including 5.8% of those under age 18 and 3.6% of those age 65 or over.

Notable people 
Bethany Balcer, professional soccer player grew up in Hudsonville 
Taylor Lautner, actor, was born and raised in Hudsonville until age 11
John Vander Wal, Major League Baseball (MLB) player, grew up in Hudsonville

References

External links
City of Hudsonville

Cities in Ottawa County, Michigan